Corinne Zanolli is an American women's field hockey player, and a member of the indoor and outdoor national teams. She has playing experience in the Pan American cups and Berlin Indoor FIH World Cup.

She also plays for Stanford University in California, where she attends college, where she set two records in season points scored.

References

American female field hockey players
1998 births
Living people
21st-century American women

2018 FIH Indoor Hockey World Cup players